Provocateur (also released on video as Agent Provocateur) is a 1997 film directed by Jim Donovan, written by Roger Kumble, and starring Lillo Brancato Jr. and Jane March.  The original score was written by Mark Nakamura and Mark Shannon.

March plays Sook Hee, a mixed-race ("honhyol") North Korean agent who ingratiates herself into the household of Colonel Greg Finn (Stephen Mendel), stationed in South Korea, to access military secrets.  While working as Finn's servant, Sook becomes acquainted with his son Chris (Brancato), and they fall in love.

External links 
 

1998 films
Films directed by Jim Donovan
1998 drama films
American spy drama films
1990s spy drama films
Films set in South Korea
1990s American films